Nelly  Ivanovna Korniyenko (May 23, 1938 – May 9, 2019) was a Soviet and Russian film and theater actress.

Career
She graduated from Mikhail Shchepkin Higher Theater School (course of Viktor Korshunov). From 1959 she worked at Maly Theatre. She was in the cinema from 1960. She had 17 roles.

She was awarded the title People's Artist of the RSFSR in 1974.

From 1980 to 1988 she taught acting at the Shchepkin Theater School.

References

External links 
 
  Nelly Korniyenko at the animator.ru

1938 births
2019 deaths
Soviet stage actresses
Soviet film actresses
Soviet voice actresses
20th-century Russian actresses
21st-century Russian actresses
Russian stage actresses
Russian film actresses
Russian voice actresses
Recipients of the Order of Honour (Russia)
Recipients of the Order of Friendship of Peoples
People's Artists of the RSFSR
Honored Artists of the RSFSR
Actresses from Moscow
Neurological disease deaths in Russia
Deaths from Parkinson's disease